Stephen Clancy (born 19 July 1992) is an Irish professional racing cyclist, who currently rides for UCI ProTeam . Clancy joined  in 2013, and like all of the team's riders, he has been diagnosed with Type 1 diabetes. He resides in Girona.

References

External links
 

1992 births
Living people
Irish male cyclists
Sportspeople from Limerick (city)
People with type 1 diabetes